Jay Karas is an American film and television director and producer.

Career
Karas's resume primarily consists of directing live telecasts and stand-up comedy specials. In recent years he moved on to directing episodic television, directing episodes of Parks and Recreation, Raising Hope, Awkward, The Fosters, Brooklyn Nine-Nine and Workaholics. In 2014, Karas made his feature film directing debut with the film Break Point, starring Jeremy Sisto and David Walton.

Karas's episode of Dice was one of The Hollywood Reporter's "Critics' Picks: The 15 Best TV Episodes of 2016" and Teachers made Vanity Fair's "5 Underrated TV Shows You Should Watch Right Now".

Filmography

Television

Comedy

Advertising
Karas has directed spots for brands including Ford, Target, Coke Zero, and Fandango, as well campaigns for ABC, Disney, E!, A&E, and TBS, including Conan's launch campaigns and the viral "Desk Wash" spot.

Music video

Awards

|-
| 2013
| Parks and Recreation
| Online Film & Television Association, OFTA Television Award, Best Direction in a Comedy Series
| 
|-
| 2014
| Break Point
| Newport Beach Film Festival, Outstanding Achievement in Filmmaking
| 
|-
| 2014
| Break Point
| SXSW Film Festival, Narrative Spotlight
|

Personal life
Jay grew up in Maryland, Virginia, and Connecticut. He attended Bloomfield High School and graduated from the University of Southern California. He lives in Italy with his wife Monica, their son Leo, and a dog named Rosie.

References

External links

Living people
American television directors
Television producers from California
Place of birth missing (living people)
Year of birth missing (living people)
University of Southern California alumni
Film directors from Los Angeles